Joanne Julian is an Armenian/American artist. She is known for her works on paper, and has produced work in several media over her long career. These include printmaking, botanical and avian illustration, Zen Buddhist ink painting, calligraphy, and abstract composition. Julian is an artist whose oeuvre is informed by Zen aesthetics. She creates calligraphic ink strokes and splashes. During visits to Japan she observed and absorbed the techniques of Zen masters.

Early life and education 

Julian was raised in the San Fernando valley. At college she majored in sculpture and printmaking. She received both her BA and MA at California State University, Northridge. In 1973 she received an MFA degree in painting from College of the Canyons in Valencia, CA. She became chair of the fine arts department and Gallery Director there.

Work
Julian has taught and lectured at ArtCenter College of Design, Glendale Community College (California), University of California, Los Angeles, California State University (Northridge) and Los Angeles Trade–Technical College.

References

External links
 

Living people
Year of birth missing (living people)
21st-century American women artists
American people of Armenian descent
Mixed-media artists
Artists from California